Gerdu or Gardu or Gordu may refer to:
Gerdu-ye Olya, Chaharmahal and Bakhtiari Province
Gerdu-ye Sofla, Chaharmahal and Bakhtiari Province
Gerdu, Hormozgan
Gerdu, Bandar Abbas, Hormozgan Province